Ed Millard (born 6 November 1946) is a Canadian wrestler. He competed in two events at the 1968 Summer Olympics.

References

External links
 

1946 births
Living people
Canadian male sport wrestlers
Olympic wrestlers of Canada
Wrestlers at the 1968 Summer Olympics
Sportspeople from Tokyo
Commonwealth Games medallists in wrestling
Commonwealth Games gold medallists for Canada
Wrestlers at the 1970 British Commonwealth Games
20th-century Canadian people
Medallists at the 1970 British Commonwealth Games